The Gift of Gab is the twenty-fifth solo studio album by American rapper E-40. It was released on June 29, 2018 via Heavy On The Grind Entertainment. It features guest appearances from Cornel West, FMB DZ, G Perico, Mike Marshall, Kent Jones, Konshens, Problem, Rich Rocka, Sada Baby, Stressmatic, Ty Dolla $ign, Vince Staples and Yhung T.O.

Track listing

Charts

References

External links

2018 albums
E-40 albums
Sick Wid It Records albums